The Belmont Lions Sports Club is an Australian rules football club which has competed in the Geelong DFL since 1965. They are based in the Geelong suburb of Belmont, Victoria.

History 

In 1965, a club located in Belmont was founded, under the name St Bernard's Football Club. It was admitted to the Geelong DFL Woolworth's Cup the same year.  With a series of average performances in 1970, both the St Bernard's and Anglesea clubs were demoted to the reserve grade competition. St Bernard's won the premiership that year and both clubs advanced back into the senior grade in 1971.

After losing 41 games in a row from 1971 to the end of 1973, the club changed its name to East Belmont Football Club in 1974. East Belmont continued to struggle, so in 1984 it found itself in second division. In the lower division it regularly made the finals but was unable to triumph, often losing the preliminary finals.

After another 58-game losing streak, the club merged with a local junior club and became known the Belmont Lions Sports Club.

In 2000, the Geelong & District Football League added Netball to the league, which was embraced by the league.

They won the flag in 2007.

Premierships 

The only premierships were in 1970 and 2007.

Sources

References

External links 

 Official Geelong and District Football League Website

Geelong & District Football League clubs
Australian rules football clubs established in 1965
1965 establishments in Australia
Australian rules football clubs in Geelong